Internal transcribed spacer (ITS) is the spacer DNA situated between the small-subunit ribosomal RNA (rRNA) and large-subunit rRNA genes in the chromosome or the corresponding transcribed region in the polycistronic rRNA precursor transcript.

ITS across life domains 
In bacteria and archaea, there is a single ITS, located between the 16S and 23S rRNA genes. Conversely, there are two ITSs in eukaryotes: ITS1 is located between 18S and 5.8S rRNA genes, while ITS2 is between 5.8S and 28S (in opisthokonts, or 25S in plants) rRNA genes. ITS1 corresponds to the ITS in bacteria and archaea, while ITS2 originated as an insertion that interrupted the ancestral 23S rRNA gene.

Organization 

In bacteria and archaea, the ITS occurs in one to several copies, as do the flanking 16S and 23S genes. When there are multiple copies, these do not occur adjacent to one another. Rather, they occur in discrete locations in the circular chromosome. It is not uncommon in bacteria to carry tRNA genes in the ITS.

In eukaryotes, genes encoding ribosomal RNA and spacers occur in tandem repeats that are thousands of copies long, each separated by regions of non-transcribed DNA termed intergenic spacer (IGS) or non-transcribed spacer (NTS).

Each eukaryotic ribosomal cluster contains the 5' external transcribed spacer (5' ETS), the 18S rRNA gene, the ITS1, the 5.8S rRNA gene, the ITS2, the 26S or 28S rRNA gene, and finally the 3' ETS.

During rRNA maturation, ETS and ITS pieces are excised. As non-functional by-products of this maturation, they are rapidly degraded.

Use in phylogenetic inference 
Sequence comparison of the eukaryotic ITS regions is widely used in taxonomy and molecular phylogeny because of several favorable properties:
 It is routinely amplified thanks to its small size associated to the availability of highly conserved flanking sequences.
 It is easy to detect even from small quantities of DNA due to the high copy number of the rRNA clusters.
 It undergoes rapid concerted evolution via unequal crossing-over and gene conversion. This promotes intra-genomic homogeneity of the repeat units, although high-throughput sequencing showed the occurrence of frequent variations within plant species.
 It has a high degree of variation even between closely related species. This can be explained by the relatively low evolutionary pressure acting on such non-coding spacer sequences.

For example, ITS markers have proven especially useful for elucidating phylogenetic relationships among the following taxa.

ITS2 is known to be more conserved than ITS1 is. All ITS2 sequences share a common core of secondary structure, while ITS1 structures are only conserved in much smaller taxonomic units. Regardless of the scope of conservation, structure-assisted comparison can provide higher resolution and robustness.

Mycological barcoding 

The ITS region is the most widely sequenced DNA region in molecular ecology of fungi and has been recommended as the universal fungal barcode sequence. It has typically been most useful for molecular systematics at the species to genus level, and even within species (e.g., to identify geographic races). Because of its higher degree of variation than other genic regions of rDNA (for example, small- and large-subunit rRNA), variation among individual rDNA repeats can sometimes be observed within both the ITS and IGS regions. In addition to the universal ITS1+ITS4 primers used by many labs, several taxon-specific primers have been described that allow selective amplification of fungal sequences (e.g., see Gardes & Bruns 1993 paper describing amplification of basidiomycete ITS sequences from mycorrhiza samples). Despite shotgun sequencing methods becoming increasingly utilized in microbial sequencing, the low biomass of fungi in clinical samples make the ITS region amplification an area of ongoing research.

References

External links 
 University of Washington Laboratory Medicine: Molecular Diagnosis | Yeast Sequencing
 ITSone DB
 ITS2 database (Schultz et al.)

DNA
Phylogenetics